Gaa, or Tiba, is a poorly documented language of Nigeria. It is apparently one of the Dakoid languages.

References

Bibliography 
Blench, Roger (2008) 'Prospecting proto-Plateau'. Manuscript.
 Blench, Roger (2011) 'The membership and internal structure of Bantoid and the border with Bantu'. Bantu IV, Humboldt University, Berlin.

Northern Bantoid languages
Languages of Nigeria